Chrysosomopsis is a genus of flies in the family Tachinidae.

Species
C. aurata (Fallén, 1820)
C. bidentata (Chao & Zhou, 1989)
C. euholoptica (Chao & Zhou, 1989)
C. ignorabilis (Zimin, 1958)
C. monoseta (Chao & Zhou, 1989)
C. ocelloseta (Chao & Zhou, 1989)
C. stricta (Aldrich, 1926)
C. vicina (Mesnil, 1953)

References

Tachininae
Tachinidae genera
Taxa named by Charles Henry Tyler Townsend